Appin Parish, Cumberland is one of the 57 parishes of Cumberland County, New South Wales, a cadastral unit for use on land titles. Its eastern boundary is the Georges River, and western boundary the Nepean River and Cataract River. It is centred on Appin.

References

New South Wales Parish maps preservation project

Parishes of Cumberland County